Tony Valeri  (born August 11, 1957) is a former Canadian politician. Valeri was the Government House Leader in Paul Martin's government from 2004 until 2006. He was narrowly defeated by New Democratic (NDP) candidate Wayne Marston in the 2006 general election held on January 23, 2006.

Biography
Valeri grew up in Hamilton's north-end in the working class Barton and Sherman neighbourhood, the son of Italian immigrants Enzo and Maria Valeri, who arrived in Hamilton in the early 1950s.  He graduated from Bishop Ryan Catholic Secondary School and then attended McMaster University, earning a Bachelor of Arts degree in economics. Prior to his political career, Valeri served as President of Canadian Financial Group Ltd.  Valeri represented the ridings of Lincoln (1993–1997), then Stoney Creek (1997–2004) and Hamilton East—Stoney Creek (2004–2006). Valeri lives with his wife Terri and children, Anthony and Luca in Stoney Creek.

Parliamentary career
Valeri first ran for office in the 1993 election, winning the Liberal Party nomination over former cabinet minister John Munro, and easily won in the Liberal sweep of Ontario.  Valeri served as a backbencher and was appointed Parliamentary Secretary to the Minister of Finance in 1997. He was appointed to the Cabinet on December 12, 2003, by incoming Prime Minister Paul Martin.

2004 nomination contest
In 2004, the decennial redistribution process took place and  Valeri's old riding of Stoney Creek, which straddled the border between Hamilton and Grimsby, was split in two.  A part of Valeri's Stoney Creek riding was merged with a part of Hamilton - East.  A slight majority of the constituents of the new riding of Hamilton East - Stoney Creek were from Valeri's former riding.  Although the other Hamilton-area Members of Parliament shifted to the eastward half of their ridings, in Valeri's case this would have meant shifting from a suburban Hamilton riding to the rural Niagara West—Glanbrook riding, where he would have faced a difficult battle with a candidate of the Conservative Party of Canada.

He therefore decided to run in the western half of his former riding, resulting in a passionate nomination battle with former cabinet heavyweight and party leadership candidate Sheila Copps.  Some accused Martin of orchestrating these events to try to expel the left-leaning Copps from the House of Commons. On March 6, 2004, Valeri won the nomination by 311 votes. Stelco's economic troubles and the large pension deficit galvanized support for New Democratic Party (NDP) candidate Tony DePaulo in Hamilton East—Stoney Creek.  The conflict with Copps, public reaction to the first budget of the Ontario Liberals, as well as the government's sinking fortunes, almost cost him his seat, but he was narrowly (less than 1,000 votes) re-elected on June 28, 2004.

Government House Leader
On July 20, 2004, he was appointed to the sensitive position of Government House Leader in Paul Martin's minority government.  Valeri's appointment to the position of House Leader was originally questioned by many, however Valeri was able to establish a working relationship with his counterparts.

As noted by Libby Davies, NDP House Leader, "We had some crazy moments but we always got down to business in a real way.  It was a pleasure to work with (Valeri)." Former Conservative House Leader John Reynolds noted that "Tony was a great House Leader.  A man of integrity and good humour."
 
In his 2008 memoir, entitled Hell Or High Water: My Life In And Out of Politics, former Prime Minister Paul Martin labeled Valeri as “one of the most gifted House Leaders of recent times.”

2006 re-election bid
On January 23, 2006, Valeri was narrowly defeated by a margin of less than 500 votes by the New Democratic Party candidate Wayne Marston. During the election, the Hamilton Spectator reported that Valeri had purchased a property for $225,000 only to later sell it to a Liberal supporter for $500,000 a few months later.  While Valeri insisted that the Ethics Commissioner had cleared the transaction, lingering doubts about the sale remained.

Post-political career
After his election defeat, Valeri established a public affairs and strategic consulting business and held a residence position within the DeGroote School of Business at McMaster University. On December 5, 2007, the Hamilton Port Authority named Valeri its interim CEO effective on December 17, 2007. He left the post in 2008.

As of June 2011, Valeri has held the position of Vice President Public Affairs at ArcelorMittal Dofasco in Hamilton.

Electoral record

References

 

1957 births
Canadian Ministers of Transport
Canadian people of Italian descent
Liberal Party of Canada MPs
Living people
Members of the House of Commons of Canada from Ontario
Members of the King's Privy Council for Canada
McMaster University alumni
Politicians from Hamilton, Ontario
Members of the 27th Canadian Ministry